Flashbacks EP is the first extended play by Romanian Pop duo Contemplate. It was released worldwide on 6 April 2018.

Track listing

Personnel
Credits adapted from allmusic data of Flashbacks.

 Contemplate – all instruments, production ; programming 
 Mihai Hotiu – Piano 
 Larisa Tămaș – Violin 
 Rebecca Pomeranz – Lyrics Assistant

References 

2018 EPs